In India, the sport of boxing is governed by the Boxing Federation of India. The majority of boxing in India occurs nationally and internationally as amateur boxing, with only a few boxers opting to pursue professional boxing. This has been attributed to a lack of promotional companies, facilities, and revenue. However, India is a regular medal-holder at international tournaments including the Asian Games and Commonwealth Games, and Olympics. Boxing has been rising in popularity in certain states, particularly in Haryana. The Bhiwani Boxing Club in Bhiwani, Haryana has produced medalists in various weight classes.

Notable boxers and boxing victories 

India's Mary Kom is a six-time World Amateur Boxing champion, and the only woman boxer to have won a medal in each one of the six world championships. She also became the first Indian woman boxer to get a Gold Medal at the Asian Games during the 2014 Asian Games at Incheon, South Korea.

At the 2008 Beijing Olympics, Vijender Singh won a bronze medal in the middleweight boxing category, while Akhil Kumar and Jitender Kumar qualified for the quarterfinals. Akhil Kumar, Jitender Kumar, A.L. Lakra, and Dinesh Kumar each won a bronze medal at the 2008 World Championship.

Vijender Singh briefly reached World No.1 in the middle weight (75 kg) category class in 2009, when the International Boxing Association's (AIBA) list was updated after 2009 AIBA World Boxing Championships held in Milan, where he won India's first medal in an AIBA-WBC. On 29 June 2015, Vijender Singh bid adieu to his amateur career by turning professional as he signed a multi-year agreement with Queensberry Promotions through IOS Sports and Entertainment. This ruled him out of 2016 Olympics as he no longer remained eligible to represent India.

Total medals won by Indian Boxers in Major tournaments

Notable Performance at Summer Olympics

In popular culture
In 2014, Priyanka Chopra portrayed Mary Kom in an award winning biographical film about her life.

References